The bombing of Kassa took place on 26 June 1941, when still unidentified aircraft conducted an airstrike on the city of Kassa, then part of Hungary, today Košice in Slovakia. This attack became the pretext for the government of Hungary to declare war on the Soviet Union the next day, 27 June.

On 26 June 1941, four days after Germany attacked the Soviet Union in violation of the Molotov–Ribbentrop non-aggression treaty as a part of Operation Barbarossa, three unidentified planes bombed the city, killing and wounding over a dozen people and causing minor material damage. Numerous buildings were hit, including the local post and telegraph office.

Hours after the attack, the Hungarian cabinet "passed a resolution calling for the declaration of the existence of a state of war between Hungary and the USSR." The local military investigators at the time believed that the attackers were Soviet, but the true identity of the attacking nation has never been established. The official explanation preferred by Soviet historians was the idea of a feigned attack by Germany to provoke Hungary into attacking the Soviet Union, employing Soviet planes captured on conquered airfields. Another possibility is that the Soviet bombers mistook Kassa for a nearby city in the First Slovak Republic, which was already at war with the Soviet Union. Captain Ádám Krúdy, the commander of the Kassa military airfield, identified the attackers as German Heinkel He 111 bombers in his official report but was ordered to keep silent about it. Another problem with the German conspiracy theory was the fact that German planes did not have bomb-racks capable of holding Soviet bombs. According to Dreisziger, "it seems that the bombs dropped on Kassa were 100 kg bombs while the standard stock of the Luftwaffe were the 50 and 250 kg bombs." During the Nuremberg trials, the USSR brought forth a statement allegedly taken from Hungarian Major General István Újszászy. According to the testimony, "the Kassa 'plot' was hatched by German and Hungarian officers and carried out by 'German planes with Russian markings'." This theory was introduced because he found that, following the Kassa bombings, certain officers behaved suspiciously, not due to concrete evidence. The reliability of his testimony less valued due to the nature of his interrogation, which may have been under duress.

In his memoirs, Admiral Miklós Horthy, Hungary's head of state in the interwar period, stated that Hungary's entry into World War II had been provoked by the "staged" bombing of Kassa carried out by German pilots. He also accused General Henrik Werth, the Hungarian Chief of Staff of being a part of the conspiracy.

In 1942, a report was made that a Hungarian officer, billeted in a house in a town of occupied Soviet Union, learned that an earlier occupant of his room had been one Andrej Andele, a Czech-born pilot of the Soviet Air Force, who had openly admitted his part in the raid on Kassa. This theory was shut down as well, due to the fact that the aircraft that bombed Kassa were twin-engined monoplanes. The Soviet Air Force did not have this kind of aircraft, but had biplanes. With this knowledge, the type of craft used in this attack could only be taken from the Germans. Another factor that breaks down this theory was the timing of the attacks. The westernmost town Kassa was reportedly attacked around shortly after 1 P.M. According to evidence brought by the Soviets at Nuremberg, the easternmost town was raided around 12:30 P.M. This evidence proved that the attack came from the east, from Soviet Union, rather than Slovakia from the west.

The most plausible explanation for the bombing was that Kassa was accidentally targeted by Soviet bombers attempting to bomb Prešov following the Slovakian declaration of war against the USSR.

References

Bibliography

External links
 Photos from 26 June 1941 (Damaged houses and post office)

B
Conflicts in 1941
Politics of World War II
Eastern European theatre of World War II
Hungary–Soviet Union relations
Military history of Hungary during World War II
1941 in Hungary
Hungary in World War II
Kassa